Hevea is a genus of flowering plants in the spurge family, Euphorbiaceae, with about ten members. It is also one of many names used commercially for the wood of the most economically important rubber tree, H. brasiliensis. The genus is native to tropical South America but is widely cultivated in other tropical countries and naturalized in several of them. It was first described in 1775.

Characteristics
French botanist and explorer Jean Baptiste Christophore Fusée Aublet first described Hevea as a genus in 1775. Trees in this genus are either deciduous or evergreen. Certain species, namely H. benthamiana, H. brasiliensis and H. microphylla, bear "winter shoots", stubby side shoots with short internodes, scale leaves on the stem and larger leaves near the tip; on these, the leaves are shed leaving the tree bare before new shoots develop. The remaining species bear more vigorous side shoots which develop before the old foliage is shed and thus the tree remains green. The leaves consist of three, usually elliptical, leaflets which are held horizontally or slightly drooping in most species. The inflorescences have separate male and female flowers, with the females being at the end of the panicles. The fruits are capsules, usually with three seeds, which in all except two species (H. spruceana and H. microphylla) split explosively when ripe to eject the large seeds.

Distribution
The genus occurs naturally in tropical South America, mostly in the Amazon basin. To the north of the basin, the land rises to the watershed of the Guiana Shield on the border between Brazil and Venezuela, and the southern foothills of these mountains form the northerly limit of the genus. It is also present in the upper reaches of the Orinoco River. The genus extends westwards as far as the foothills of the Andes and southwards to the foothills of the Mato Grosso. Its easterly limit is the Atlantic Ocean. 
The most widespread species is H. guianensis which occurs over the whole range of the genus.

The Pará rubber tree (H. brasiliensis) occurs mainly south of the Amazon, as does H. camporum, but the greatest diversity occurs to the north of the river, in the Rio Negro region, where all the other species occur. In this area where there are variations in soil and topography and the rainforest experiences conditions of all-year-round humidity, the genus Hevea has been undergoing a high degree of speciation. The high humidity encourages the growth of fungal leaf diseases, and the species that are deciduous avoid immediate transfer of fungal spores from old leaves onto new growth. The Pará rubber tree has been introduced to and is naturalised in many tropical countries in Asia.

Habitat
Each species has its own habitat requirements; H. brasiliensis grows on well-drained soils but tolerates light flooding; H. guianensis, H. pauciflora and H. rigidifolia grow in well-drained soil, on high river banks and on slopes; and H. camporum grows on savannahs. Other species such as H. benthamiana, H. microphylla and H. spruceana need wetter conditions in locations subject to seasonal flooding for several months each year, and H. nitida grows both in periodically inundated swamps and in drier locations such as rocky hillsides well above the flood level.

Species
The following species are recognised:
 Hevea benthamiana Müll.Arg. – Venezuela, SE Colombia, N Brazil
 Hevea brasiliensis (Willd. ex A.Juss.) Müll.Arg. – Pará rubber tree – Brazil, French Guiana, Venezuela, Colombia, Peru, Bolivia; naturalized in parts of Asia and Africa and on some tropical islands
 Hevea camargoana Pires – Marajó, Pará State in Brazil
 Hevea camporum Ducke – Amazonas State in Brazil
 Hevea guianensis Aubl. – Venezuela, Ecuador, Peru, Guyana, Suriname, French Guiana, Colombia, N Brazil
 Hevea microphylla Ule – Venezuela, Colombia, N Brazil
 Hevea nitida Mart. ex Müll.Arg. – Colombia, Amazonas State in Brazil
 Hevea pauciflora (Spruce ex Benth.) Müll.Arg. – Venezuela, Peru, Guyana, Suriname, French Guiana, Colombia, N Brazil
 Hevea rigidifolia (Spruce ex Benth.) Müll.Arg.  – Vaupés region of Colombia, Amazonas State in Brazil
 Hevea spruceana (Benth.) Müll.Arg. – Guyana, Amazonas State in Brazil

References

External links 
 
 

Euphorbiaceae genera
Crotonoideae
Flora of South America
Rubber